Kidland is a former civil parish, now in the parish of Alwinton in Northumberland, England, about  northwest of Alwinton village. In 1951 the parish had a population of 58.

History 
From 1856 Kidland was a civil parish in its own right until it was merged with Alwinton on 1 April 1955.

Governance 
Kidland is in the parliamentary constituency of Berwick-upon-Tweed.

References

External links 
 GENUKI (Accessed: 3 December 2008)

Former civil parishes in Northumberland
Alwinton